Less than the Dust is a 1916 American silent feature film produced by and starring Mary Pickford with a release by Artcraft Pictures, an affiliate of Paramount Pictures. John Emerson directed and Eric von Stroheim was one of the assistant directors. There is a 35mm copy of this film that still survives.

Cast

Mary Pickford - Radha
David Powell - Capt. Richard Townsend
Frank Losee - Capt. Bradshaw
Mary Alden - Mrs. Bradshaw
Mario Majeroni - Ramlan
Cesare Gravina - Jawan
Francis Joyner - A Derelict
Russell Bassett - Ahmed
Walter Morgan - Bhesstie
Merceita Esmond - A Gossip(*as Mercita Esmonde)
Nathaniel Sack - Undetermined Role
Frank Lackteen - (*unbilled)

References

External links

 allmovie/synopsis; Less Than the Dust

1916 films
1916 drama films
Silent American drama films
American silent feature films
American black-and-white films
Films directed by John Emerson
1910s American films